Gimcheon (trans., 'gold spring city') is a city in North Gyeongsang Province, South Korea.  It is situated on the major land transportation routes between Seoul and Busan, namely the Gyeongbu Expressway and Gyeongbu Line railway.

In ancient times, Gimcheon was famous for its three mountains (Geumo, Daedeok, Hwangak) and two rivers (Gamcheon, Jikjicheon). During the Chosun Dynasty, Gimcheon had one of the five largest markets in the region. The town has also served as the gateway and traffic hub of the Yeongnam region and is particularly proud of its patriots, history and conservative lifestyle.

The slogan of Gimcheon city is 'Central Gimcheon', a recognition of the fact that it is situated almost at the center of South Korea.

History
 Samhan Period : called Gammun－guk, Jujoma－guk
 Three kingdoms : Silla united Gammun－guk and Jujoma－guk and established Gammunju
 Unified Silla : Gammunju was renamed as Gaeryeonggun. Gimsanhyeon, Jiryehyeon, Eomohyeon and Mupunghyeon were placed.
 Goryeo Period : Gaeryeonggun was changed into Gaeryeonghyeon. Gimsanhyeon and Jiryehyeon were included into Gyeongsanbu.
 Joseon Period : During the Joseon Dynasty, it was located in Gimsan-gun, Jirye-hyeon, and Gaeryeong-hyeon, Gyeongsang-do. With the opening of the Gyeongbu Railway in 1905, it was developed as a collection area for agricultural products and other products.
 1914  Gimsan, Jirye (except Gilbangri Jeungsanmyeon), Gaeryeonggun and Singokmyeon of Seongju were united into Gimcheongun(20myeons).
 1917 : Gimcheonmyeon was promoted to Gimcheon special myeon.
 1931 : Gimcheon special myeon was promoted to Gimcheoneup ( 1eup, 15 myeons).
 1949 : Gimcheoneup was promoted to Gimcheon city, Gimcheongun wa renamed geumneunggun.
 1983 : 4 ris of Geumneunggun were included into Gimcheon city. 2 ris of geumneunggun were included into Seonsangun.
 1998 : arrangement of 13-dongs in Gimcheon city into 9-dongs (1-eup, 14-myeons, 9-dongs), arrangement of 9-dongs in Gimcheon city into 8-dongs (1-eup, 14-myeons, 8-dongs).

Culture and sightseeing

Sights

Gimcheon's claim to fame is Jikjisa Temple (직지사), located at the foot of Mt. Hwangaksan. The temple was constructed in 418 (the 2nd year of King Nulji's reign, Silla Dynasty). Jikjisa is an important head temple of the Jogye Order of Korean Buddhism. This temple is in perfect harmony with the nearby valley and pine forest. The foliage in fall is particularly breathtaking. It features Birojeon Hall (also known as ‘Cheonbuljeon Hall’), in which approximately 1,000 Buddha statues are enshrined, along with a thousand year old arrowroot. Iljumun Gate, Daeungjeon Hall (one of the most famous architectural structures of the Joseon Dynasty) and a 1.63m-tall Seated Stone Buddhist Statue (Treasures No. 319) from the Unified Silla Period, can also be found on the temple grounds.

Jikjisa is believed to have been first constructed by the Goguryeo monk Ado in the year 418, long before Buddhism gained general acceptance in Silla. Jikjisa was largely destroyed during the Seven Year War in the 1590s. The reconstruction of the temple spanned from 1610 to about 1670.

Jikjisa is possibly one of the oldest temples in South Korea and it is relatively well-connected to a convenient train and bus service. Jikjisa Station is located at the foot of the mountain, along the Gyeongbu Line railroad. It is served only by local commuter trains, which run twice daily in each direction. Overnight or weekend temple stay programs are available at the main complex.

Temple admission fees:
Adults: 2,500 won
Youth: 1,500 won
Children: 1,000 won
＊Free: ages under 6 and over 65

Directions to Jikjisa:
- Dong Seoul Terminal to Gimcheon (Departure 3 times a day (10:10, 14:10, 18:10), 3 hour ride).
- Get on the bus (No. 11, No. 111) to Jikjisa Temple at Gimcheon Station or Gimcheon Bus Terminal(25 minute ride).

Hiking & mountains

Mt. Hwangaksan (1,111m in elevation), home of Jikjisa, is located in the Sobaeksan Mountains. The area is a habitat for many cranes that reside on this mountain. This location is also known for its pine forests, streams, fall foliage and snowscapes.

Other natural and outdoor cultural properties:
 Sudo Valley
 Yongo Waterfall
 Yetnalsomssimaeul Culture Village
 Sculpture Park
 Riverside Park
 Yeonhwaji Pond

Festivals

 Grape Sale Promotional Event
Various events including a beauty pageant, a grape fair, sales and food fair introducing various grape foods are offered every July in the downtown area.

 Half-Marathon Race
An annual sporting event held at the Sport City every May. Traditional military band performances and ballroom dancing are also offered, in addition to various food events.

 Family Drama Festival
An annual festival at the Gimcheon Art Hall every October emphasizing the importance of family through plays and dramatic performances.

Museums
 Bitnae Nong-ak Training Center
 World Ceramic Museum

Temples and cultural sites
 Cheongamsa Temple
 Sudoam Temple
 Gyerimsa Temple
 Gaenyeong Hyangyo Confucian School
 Jirye Hanggyo Confucian School
 Hahoe House of the Seongsan Yeo Family
 Seated Buddha Statue, Gahangsa Temple
 Bangchojeong Pavilion
 The Church of Jesus Christ of Latter-Day Saints
 The House and Residence of Local Man Jang-Yeoul Lee

Other places of interest
 Baegsu Literature Hall
 Culture & Art Hall
 Gimcheon Municipal Library
 Citizen's Bell
 Obong Reservoir
 Sports City
 Gimcheon University

Shopping and restaurants

Gimcheon's dining options mainly consist of the average Korean, Japanese, and Chinese restaurants that are found throughout South Korea. The majority of the city's restaurants are locally owned but some major chains can also be found.

Traditional food

Traditional restaurants can be found in almost all of Gimcheon's districts but the largest concentration of such establishments is located at the base of Jikjisa Temple, in the Jikji Culture Park. The Culture Park features an ample selection of both local and traditional specialities.

Expat and Western dining

The Lucky Penny is a locally owned restaurant in the Bugok-dong neighborhood. The menu includes Western and American favorites such as hamburgers, quesadillas, Philly cheesesteak sandwiches and other western dishes.

Shopping

Downtown Gimcheon, centered around the train station, consists of the largest selection of shopping in town. In the middle of town there is a five-day market held on days ending in 0 and 5. Most days, though, there quite a few vendors in the area and the two largest traditional markets in town are always open for business.

Being a smaller town, Gimcheon does lack certain amenities such as large department stores. The closest locations for larger stores is the city of Gumi, located roughly 20 minutes away by train, where shops such as Lotte Mart and Homeplus can easily be found.

Climate
Gimcheon has a humid continental climate (Köppen: Dwa), but can be considered a borderline humid subtropical climate (Köppen: Cwa) using the  isotherm.

Transportation

Road

Gimcheon is located along the Gyeongbu Expressway and many major roadways connect the city to other surrounding areas.

Rail

Main transportation connections are via the Gyeongbu Line and the Gyeongbuk Line train lines. In 2010, a newly constructed KTX station, Gimcheon-Gumi Station opened on the outskirts of the city center The district around this new KTX station is slowly expanding, however, currently it is only accessible by vehicle, local bus or taxi. From the KTX station to Gimcheon Train Station (the main downtown shopping center) via taxi, it is roughly a 15,000 to 20,000₩ expense.

Community and expat information

In 2004, it was reported that the population was 144,587, including 143,527 Koreans and 1,060 non-Koreans.

While Gimcheon is much smaller compared to its nearby counterparts, there is a sizeable expat community scattered amongst the seven district neighborhoods. As of 2013, there are an estimated 40 to 60 expats residing within the city limits, most employed as English teachers through the government run EPIK (English Program in Korea) and TaLK programs.

Local specialties

 Grapes - Gimcheon is responsible for 11% of total grape production in Korea. 
 Plums - 29% of the total plum production in Korea stems from Gimcheon. They are high in vitamin A and known for aiding with fatigue.
 Gwahaju - Literally named "post-summer wine", this local drink is made from glutinous rice and yeast. Fresh water for production is sourced from Gimcheon's Gwahacheon Stream.
 Jirye Wild Boar Meat - Said to be especially beneficial for young children due to a high concentration of protein, healthy fats and DHA.
 Brassware and gong production.
 Joma Potatoes

Administrative districts

The outlying regions of Gimcheon are divided into fourteen myeon (or townships) and one eup (or large village).  In addition, the city center is divided into seven dong, or precincts.

Notable people
Shin Hyun-joon, first commandant of the South Korean marine corps

Sister cities

 Chengdu, Sichuan, China
 Nanao, Ishikawa, Japan

See also
 Hwanggeum-dong, Gimcheon
 List of cities in South Korea

References

External links

City government website (in English)
City government website (in Korean)
Jikjisa Temple

 
Cities in North Gyeongsang Province